Temple Mountain is a  mountain in the Wapack Range in Hillsborough County, New Hampshire, United States.

The mountain lies within the towns of Sharon, Temple and Peterborough. The  Wapack Trail traverses the mountain. The northern face includes the state-owned  Temple Mountain Reservation Area, formerly Temple Mountain Ski Area.

Pack Monadnock Mountain is located directly to the north along the Wapack ridgeline; Kidder Mountain to the south. Scattered ledges along the ridgeline offer long vistas west to Mount Monadnock and south along the spine of the Wapack Range; the abandoned ski area on the north side of the mountain offers 270-degree views.

The east side of the mountain drains into the Souhegan River watershed, thence into the Merrimack River and Atlantic Ocean; the west side drains into the Contoocook River, thence into the Merrimack River.

See also

 List of mountains of New Hampshire

References

 Southern New Hampshire Trail Guide (1999). Boston: The Appalachian Mountain Club.

External links

 Friends of the Wapack
 Temple Mountain Fact Sheet - New Hampshire Division of Parks and Recreation (PDF, slightly outdated)

Mountains of Hillsborough County, New Hampshire
Mountains of New Hampshire
Temple, New Hampshire